Alexander James Anderson (July 1, 1863 – June 3, 1946) was a Canadian politician, barrister and lawyer. He was elected to the House of Commons of Canada as a member of the historical Conservative Party in 1925 representing Toronto—High Park where he was re-elected in 1926 and in 1930. He was also re-elected in the new riding of High Park in 1935 and 1940.

External links 

1863 births
1946 deaths
19th-century Canadian lawyers
Members of the House of Commons of Canada from Ontario
Conservative Party of Canada (1867–1942) MPs